The 2014 UCF Knights baseball team represented the University of Central Florida in the 2014 college baseball season. The Knights competed in Division I of the National Collegiate Athletic Association (NCAA) and the American Athletic Conference (The American). The team played their home games at Jay Bergman Field (also known as the UCF Baseball Complex), located on UCF's main campus in Orlando, Florida. The Knights were led by head coach Terry Rooney, who was in his sixth season with the team.

Personnel

Coaching Staff

Roster

Schedule

! style="background:#000000;color:#BC9B6A;"| Regular Season
|- valign="top" 

|- bgcolor="#ccffcc"
| February 14 ||  || – || Jay Bergman Field || 8–1 || SKOGLUND, E.(1-0) || Gage(0-1) || None || 1,891 || 1-0 || –
|- bgcolor="#ccffcc"
| February 15 || Siena || – || Jay Bergman Field || 11–4 || DAVIS, S.(1-0) || Lewicki(0-1) || None || 1,310 || 2-0 || –
|- bgcolor="#ccffcc"
| February 16 || Siena || – || Jay Bergman Field || 9–6 || THOMAS, P.(1-0) || Quintana(0-1) ||FAVRE, Z.(1) || 1,477 || 3-0 || –
|- align="center" bgcolor="#ffbbb"
| February 18 || at Florida|| – || Alfred A. McKethan Stadium || 1–5 || Young (1-0) || MAROTTA, J.(0-1) || None || 2,994 || 3-1 || –
|- align="center" bgcolor="#ffbbb"
| February 21 ||  || – || Jay Bergman Field || 3–9 || Lakins(1-0) || THOMAS, P.(0-1) || None || 1,616 || 3-2|| –
|- bgcolor="#ccffcc"
| February 22 ||  || – || Jay Bergman Field || 4–1 || DAVIS, S.(2-0) || Choplick, A.(1-1) || THOMPSON, T.(1)|| 1,493 || 4-2 || –
|- bgcolor="#ccffcc"
| February 23 || The Citadel || – || Jay Bergman Field || 9–7 || OLSON, T.(1-0) || Livingston(0-1) || MARTIN, T.(1) || 1,349 || 5-2 || –
|- bgcolor="#ccffcc"
| February 25 || at  || – ||John Sessions Stadium || 5–3 ||  RODGERS, Z.(1-0) || Maxon, A.(0-1) || None || 147 || 6-2 || –
|- align="center" bgcolor="#ffbbb"
| February 28|| at #24 Ole Miss || – || Swayze Field || 3–4 || C. Bickel(2-1) || THOMAS, P.(1-2) || None || 5,903 || 6-3|| –
|-

|- align="center" bgcolor="#ffbbb"
| March 1 || at #24 Ole Miss || – || Swayze Field  || 4-5 || W. Short(2-0) || THOMPSON, T.(0-1) || None || 8,239 || 6-4 || -
|- align="center" bgcolor="#ffbbb"
| March 2 || at #24 Ole Miss || – || Swayze Field || 2-9 || S. Smith(2-0) || HOWELL, R.(0-1) || None || 6,035 || 6-5 || –
|- align="center" bgcolor="#ffbbb"
| March 4 || at  || – || Jackie Robinson Ballpark  || 2-5 || DURAPAU,M(2-0) || RODGERS, Z.(1-1) ||  AUSTIN,M(1) || 218 || 6-6 || –
|- align="center" bgcolor="#ffbbb"
| March 5 ||  || – || Jay Bergman Field  || 2-3 || Balicki(1-1) || OLSON, T.(1-1) || Bourque(1) || 1,330 || 6–7 || -
|- align="center" bgcolor="#ffbbb"
| March 7 ||  || – || Jay Bergman Field  || 6-7 || T. Black(1-1) || T. Thompson(0-2) || None || 937 || 6-8 || -
|- align="center" bgcolor="#ffbbb"
| March 8 || Central Michigan || – || Jay Bergman Field  || 2-3 || T. Black(2-1) || P. Thomas(1-3) || J. McNamara(1) || 1,058 || 6-9 || –
|- bgcolor="#ccffcc"
| March 9 || Central Michigan || – || Jay Bergman Field  || 5-4 || J. Petree(1-0) || N. Deeg(0-1) || T. Thompson(2) || 1,073 || 7-9 || –
|- align="center" bgcolor="#ffbbb"
| March 11 || #2 Florida State || – || Jay Bergman Field  || 10-11 || D. Silva(1-0) || T. Thompson(0-3) || J. Wintson(3) || 3,953 || 7-10 || –
|- align="center" bgcolor="#ffbbb"
| March 12 || #2 Florida State || – || Jay Bergman Field  || 1-18 || B. Holtman(3-0) || T. Martin(0-1) || None || 3,105 || 7-11 || –
|- bgcolor="#ccffcc"
| March 14 ||  || – || Jay Bergman Field  || 10-0 || E. Skoglund(2-0) || Coughlin(0-1) || None || 1,197 || 8-11 || –
|- bgcolor="#ccffcc"
| March 15 || Central Connecticut || – || Jay Bergman Field  || 9-8 || Z. Rodgers(2-1) || Severino(0-1) || None || 1,279 || 9-11 || –
|- align="center" bgcolor="#ffbbb"
| March 16 || Central Connecticut || – || Jay Bergman Field  || 4-5 || Ingham(1-0) || T. Martin(0-2) || None || 1,097 || 9-12 || –
|- bgcolor="#ccffcc"
| March 18 || at #25  || – || Mark Light Field at Alex Rodriguez Park  || 9-2 || T. Olson(2-1) || D. Garcia(0-1) || None || 2,406 || 10-12 || –
|- bgcolor="#ccffcc"
| March 21 || * || – || Jay Bergman Field  || 7-1 || E. Skoglund(3-0) || Atkinson(2-1) || None || 1,239 || 11-12 || 1–0
|- bgcolor="#ccffcc"
| March 22 || Cincinnati* || – || Jay Bergman Field  || 7-4 || J. Petree(2-0) || C. Walsh(2-3) || Z. Rodgers(1) || 1,174 || 12-12 || 2–0
|- bgcolor="#ccffcc"
| March 23 || Cincinnati* || – || Jay Bergman Field  || 5-1 || R. Meyer(1-0) || Zellner(1-2) || J. Marotta(1) || 1,168 || 13-12 || 3–0
|- bgcolor="#ccffcc"
| March 26 || Bethune-Cookman || – || Jay Bergman Field  || 4-1 || R. Meyer(2-0) || R. O'Brien(0-1) || T. Thompson(3) || 1,305 || 14-12 || 3–0
|- bgcolor="#ccffcc"
| March 28 || * || – || Jay Bergman Field  || 6-4 || E. Skoglund(4-0) || Hockenberry(3-1) || Z. Rodgers(2) || 1,279 || 15-12 || 4–0
|- bgcolor="#ccffcc"
| March 29 || Temple* || – || Jay Bergman Field  || 8-2 || T. Olson(3-1) || Hill(0-4) || None || 1,039 || 16-12 || 5–0
|- bgcolor="#ccffcc"
| March 30 || Temple* || – || Jay Bergman Field  || 12-5 || Z. Rodgers(3-1) || Kuehn(1-1) || None || 1,281 || 17-12 || 6–0
|-

|- bgcolor="#ccffcc"
| April 1 || at  || – || Harmon Stadium || 8-4 || J. Marrota(1-1) || Nolan(1-2) || None || 583 || 18-12 || 6-0
|- bgcolor="#ccffcc"
| April 4 || at * || – || USF Baseball Stadium ||  2-0 || E. Skoglund(5-0) || Herget(4-4) || Z. Rodgers(3) || 1,219 || 19-12 || 7-0
|- align="center" bgcolor="#ffbbb"
| April 5 || at South Florida* || – || USF Baseball Stadium || 2-4 || MULHOLLAND(3-0) || T. Olson(3-2) || None || 1,189 || 19-13 || 7-1
|- bgcolor="#ccffcc"
| April 6 || at South Florida* || – || USF Baseball Stadium || 6-3 || Z. Rodgers(4-1) || Peterson(2-1) || T. Thompson(4) || 1,739 || 20-13 || 8-1
|- align="center" bgcolor="#ffbbb"
| April 9 || #24 Miami || – || Jay Bergman Field || 5-6 || Garcia(3-2) || T. Thompson(0-4) || None || 2,021 || 20-14 || 8-1
|- align="center" bgcolor="#ffbbb"
| April 11 || at * || – || FedExPark || 1-2 || Caufield(1-1) || E. Skoglund(5-1) || None || 704 || 20-15 || 8-2
|- bgcolor="#ccffcc"
| April 12 || at Memphis* || – || FedExPark || 9-8 || Z. Farve(1-0) || Myers(0-1) || Z. Rodgers(1) || 871 || 21-15 || 9-2
|- bgcolor="#ccffcc"
| April 13 || at Memphis* || – || FedExPark || 10-0 || R. Meyer(3-0) || Lee(1-4) || None || 857 || 22-15 || 10-2
|- bgcolor="#ccffcc"
| April 15 || || – || Jay Bergman Field || 11-4 || R. Howell(1-1) || SCHAEFFER(0-2) || None || 1,004 || 23-15 || 10-2
|- bgcolor="#ccffcc"
| April 17 || #9 Louisville* || – || Jay Bergman Field || 8-2 || E. Skoglund(6-1) || Funkhouser(7-2) || None || 1,342 || 24-15 || 11-2
|- bgcolor="#ccffcc"
| April 17 || #9 Louisville* || – || Jay Bergman Field || 4-3 || T. Thompson(1-4) || Burdi(2-1) || None || 1,342 || 25-15 || 12-2
|- align="center" bgcolor="#ffbbb"
| April 18 || #9 Louisville* || – || Jay Bergman Field || 2-3 || Kidston (4-0) || R. Myer(3-1) || Burdi(8) || 1,194 || 25-16 || 12-3
|- bgcolor="#ccffcc"
| April 25 || * || 22 || Jay Bergman Field || 3-1 || E. Skoglund(7-1) || Brey(4-2) || None || 1,344 || 26-16 || 13-3
|- bgcolor="#ccffcc"
| April 26 || Rutgers* || 22 || Jay Bergman Field || 4-3 || Z. Rodgers(5-1) || Young(0-4) || None || 1,253 || 27-16 || 14-3
|- bgcolor="#ccffcc"
| April 27 || Rutgers* || 22 || Jay Bergman Field || 10-3 || J. Petree(3-0) || Baxter(2-7) || None || 1,183 || 28-16 || 15-3
|-

|- bgcolor="#ccffcc"
| May 2 ||  at #13 Houston* || 18 || Cougar Field ||4–3 || E. Skoglund (8–1) || Garza (6–4) || Z. Rodgers (5) || 1,226 || 29–16 || 16–3
|- align="center" bgcolor="#ffbbb"
| May 3 ||  at #13 Houston* || 18 || Cougar Field || 3–4 || Maxwell (3–0) || T. Thompson (1–5) || None || 1,383 || 29–17 || 16–4
|- align="center" bgcolor="#ffbbb"
| May 4 ||  at #13 Houston* || 18 || Cougar Field || 2–5|| Ford (6–0) || T. Olson (3–3) ||  Wellbrock (10) || 1,448 || 29–18 || 16–5
|- align="center" bgcolor="#ffbbb"
| May 6 ||  || 26 || Jay Bergman Field || 0–1 ||  Rhodes (3–0) || S. Davis (2–1) || Alexander (6) || 1,208 || 29–19 || 16–5
|- bgcolor="#ccffcc"
| May 7 ||  at Florida Atlantic || 26 || FAU Baseball Stadium || 4–1 || Z. Rodgers (6–1) || Strawn (4–6) || T. Thompson (5) || 376 || 30–19 || 16–5
|- bgcolor="#ccffcc"
| May 9 ||  || 26 || Jay Bergman Field || 10–0 || E. Skoglund (9–1) || C. Knox (6–7) || None || 1,104 || 31–19 || 16–5
|- align="center" bgcolor="#ffbbb"
| May 10 ||  Presbyterian || 26 || Jay Bergman Field || 3–6 || Wortkoetter (3–3) || T. Thompson (1–6) || None || 1,293 || 31–20 || 16–5
|- bgcolor="#ccffcc"
| May 11 ||  Presbyterian || 26 || Jay Bergman Field || 11–2 || J. Petree (4–0) || T. Hayes (0–4) || None || 1,239 || 32–20 || 16–5
|- bgcolor="#ccffcc"
| May 13 || at #4 Florida State || – || Dick Howser Stadium || 8–3 || R. Howell (2–1) || Byrd (1–1) || None || 3,871 || 33–20 || 16–5
|- align="center" bgcolor="#ffbbb"
| May 15 ||  at Connecticut* || – || J. O. Christian Field || 4–5 || Marzi (5–6) || E. Skoglund (9–2) || Kay (1) || 108 || 33–21 || 16–6
|- align="center" bgcolor="#ffbbb"
| May 16 ||  at Connecticut* || – || J. O. Christian Field  || 5–6 || Kay (5–4) || Z. Favre (1–1) || None || 116 || 33–22 || 16–7
|- bgcolor="#ccffcc"
| May 17 ||  at Connecticut* || – || J. O. Christian Field || 7–6 || R. Howell (3–1) || Brown (1–1) || P. Thomas (1) || 127 || 34–22 || 17–7
|-

|-
! style="background:#000000;color:#BC9B6A;"| Post Season
|- valign="top" 

|- bgcolor="#ccffcc"
| May 21 || Connecticut || – || Bright House Field || 7–1 || Z. Rodgers (7–1) || Marzi (5–7) || None || – || 1–0
|- bgcolor="#ccffcc"
| May 22 || Temple || – || Bright House Field || 6–2 || R. Howell (4–1) || Vanderslice (1–5) || None || 1,157 || 2–0
|- align="center" bgcolor="#ffbbb"
| May 23 || Houston || – || Bright House Field || 8–13 || Garza (8–4) || E. Skoglund (9–3) || Wellbrock (12) || 1,327 || 2–1
|-

|-
| style="font-size:88%"| Rankings from USA TODAY/ESPN Top 25 coaches' baseball poll. Parenthesis indicate tournament seedings.
|-
| style="font-size:88%"| *Conference game

See also
UCF Knights

References

UCF
UCF Knights baseball seasons